Vathek (alternatively titled Vathek, an Arabian Tale or The History of the Caliph Vathek) is a Gothic novel written by William Beckford. It was composed in French beginning in 1782, and then translated into English by Reverend Samuel Henley in which form it was first published in 1786 without Beckford's name as An Arabian Tale, From an Unpublished Manuscript, claiming to be translated directly from Arabic. The first French edition, titled simply as Vathek, was published in December 1786 (postdated 1787). In the twentieth century some editions include The Episodes of Vathek (Vathek et ses épisodes), three related tales intended by Beckford to be so incorporated, but omitted from the original edition and published separately long after his death.

Plot introduction
Vathek capitalised on the eighteenth- (and early nineteenth-) century obsession with all things Oriental (see Orientalism), which was inspired by Antoine Galland's translation of The Arabian Nights (itself retranslated, into English, in 1708). Beckford was also influenced by similar works from the French writer Voltaire. His originality lay in combining the popular Oriental elements with the Gothic stylings of Horace Walpole's The Castle of Otranto (1764). The result stands alongside Walpole's novel and Mary Shelley's Frankenstein (1818) in the first rank of early Gothic fiction.

Description
William Beckford wrote Vathek in French in 1782, when he was 21. He often stated that Vathek was written as an emotional response to "the events that happened at Fonthill at Christmas 1781", when he had prepared an elaborate Orientally-inspired entertainment at his lavish country estate with the assistance of renowned painter and set designer Philip James de Loutherbourg. Beckford said that it took him only two to three days and the intervening nights to write the entire book.

Vathek was written during a time when part of European culture was influenced by Orientalism. It is an Arabian tale because of the oriental setting and characters and the depiction of oriental cultures, societies, and myth. Vathek is also a Gothic novel with its emphasis on the supernatural, ghosts, and spirits, as well as the terror it tries to induce in the reader.

The title character is inspired by al-Wathiq, son of al-Mu'tasim, an Abbasid caliph who reigned in 842–847 (227–232 AH in the Islamic calendar) who had a great thirst for knowledge and became a great patron to scholars and artists. During his reign, a number of revolts broke out. He took an active role in quelling them. He died of fever on 10 August 847.

The narrative of Vathek uses a third person, omniscient, semi-intrusive narrator. The novel, while it may lend itself to be divided into chapters, is one complete manuscript without pause.

Plot summary

The novel chronicles the fall from power of the Caliph Vathek, who renounces Islam and engages with his mother, Carathis, in a series of licentious and deplorable activities designed to gain him supernatural powers. At the end of the novel, instead of attaining these powers, Vathek descends into a hell ruled by the fallen angel Eblis where he is doomed to wander endlessly and speechlessly.

Vathek, the ninth caliph of the Abassides, ascended to the throne at an early age. He is a majestic figure, terrible in anger (one glance of his flashing eye can make "the wretch on whom it was fixed instantly [fall] backwards and sometimes [expire]"), and addicted to the pleasures of the flesh. He is intensely thirsty for knowledge and often invites scholars to converse with him. If he fails to convince the scholar of his points of view, he attempts a bribe; if this does not work, he sends the scholar to prison. To better study astronomy, he builds an observation tower with 11,000 steps.

A hideous stranger arrives in town, claiming to be a merchant from India selling precious goods. Vathek buys glowing swords with letters on them from the merchant, and invites the merchant to dinner. When the merchant does not respond to Vathek's questions, Vathek looks at him with his "evil eye", but this has no effect, so Vathek imprisons him. The next day, he discovers that the merchant has escaped and his prison guards are dead. The people begin to call Vathek crazy. His Greek mother, Carathis, tells him that the merchant was "the one talked about in the prophecy", and Vathek admits that he should have treated the stranger kindly.

Vathek wants to decipher the messages on his new sabres, offers a reward to anyone who can help him, and punishes those who fail. After several scholars fail, one elderly man succeeds: the swords say "We were made where everything is well made; we are the least of the wonders of a place where all is wonderful and deserving, the sight of the first potentate on earth".  But the next morning, the message has changed: the sword now says "Woe to the rash mortal who seeks to know that of which he should remain ignorant, and to undertake that which surpasses his power".  The old man flees before Vathek can punish him.  However, Vathek realises that the writing on the swords really did change.

Vathek then develops an insatiable thirst and often goes to a place near a high mountain to drink from one of four fountains there, kneeling at the edge of the fountain to drink. One day he hears a voice telling him to "not assimilate [him]self to a dog". It was the voice of the merchant who had sold him the swords, a mysterious man whom Vathek calls "Giaour", an Ottoman term used for non-believers. The Giaour cures his thirst with a potion and the two men return to Samarah.  Vathek returns to immersing himself in the pleasures of the flesh, and begins to fear that the Giaour, who is now popular at Court, will seduce one of his wives. Vathek makes a fool of himself trying to out-drink the Giaour, and to out-eat him; when he sits upon the throne to administer justice, he does so haphazardly. His prime vizier rescues him from disgrace by whispering that Carathis had read a message in the stars foretelling a great evil to befall Vathek and his vizier Morakanabad; the vizier informs Vathek that Carathis advises him to ask the Giaour about the drugs he used in the potion, lest that be a poison. When Vathek confronts him, the Giaour only laughs, so Vathek gets angry and kicks him. The Giaour is transformed into a ball and Vathek compels everyone in the palace to kick it, even the resistant Carathis and Morakanabad. Then Vathek has the whole town kick the ball-shaped merchant into a remote valley. Vathek stays in the area and eventually hears Giaour's voice telling him that if he will worship the Giaour and the jinns of the earth, and renounce the teachings of Islam, he will bring Vathek to "the palace of the subterrain fire" (22) where Soliman Ben Daoud controls the talismans that rule over the world.

Vathek agrees, and proceeds with the ritual that the Giaour demands: to sacrifice fifty of the city's children. In return, Vathek will receive a key of great power. Vathek holds a "competition" among the children of the nobles of Samarah, declaring that the winners will receive "endless favors". As the children approach Vathek for the competition, he throws them inside an ebony portal to be sacrificed. Once this is finished, the Giaour makes the portal disappear. The Samaran citizens see Vathek alone and accuse him of having sacrificed their children to the Giaour, and form a mob to kill Vathek. Carathis pleads with Morakanabad to help save Vathek's life; the vizier complies, and calms the crowd down.

Vathek wonders when his reward will come, and Carathis says that he must fulfill his end of the pact and sacrifice to the jinn of the earth. Carathis helps him prepare the sacrifice: she and her son climb to the top of the tower and mix oils to create an explosion of light. The people, presuming that the tower is on fire, rush up the stairs to save Vathek from being burnt to death. Instead, Carathis sacrifices them to the jinn. Carathis performs another ritual and learns that for Vathek to claim his reward, he must go to Istakhar.

Vathek goes away with his wives and servants, leaving the city in the care of Morakanabad and Carathis.  A week after he leaves, his caravan is attacked by carnivorous animals. The soldiers panic and accidentally set the area on fire; Vathek and his wives must flee. Still, they continue on their way. They reach steep mountains where the Islamic dwarfs dwell. They invite Vathek to rest with them, possibly in the hopes of converting him back to Islam. Vathek sees a message his mother left for him: "Beware of old doctors and their puny messengers of but one cubit high: distrust their pious frauds; and, instead of eating their melons, impale on a spit the bearers of them. Should thou be so fool as to visit them, the portal to the subterranean place will shut in thy face" (53). Vathek becomes angry and claims that he has followed the Giaour's instructions long enough. He stays with the dwarfs, meets their Emir, named Fakreddin, and the Emir's beautiful daughter Nouronihar.

Vathek wants to marry her, but she is already in love with and promised to her effeminate cousin Gulchenrouz. Vathek thinks she should be with a "real" man and arranges for Bababalouk to kidnap Gulchenrouz. The Emir, finding of the attempted seduction, bends his head and asks Vathek to kill him, as he is ashamed to have seen "the prophet's vice-regent violate the laws of hospitality." But Nouronihar prevents Vathek from killing her father, and Gulchenrouz escapes. The Emir and his servants plan to safeguard Nouronihar and Gulchenrouz by drugging them and hiding them in a valley by a lake. The plan succeeds temporarily, but when they awake in the valley, they believe they have died and are in purgatory. Nouronihar, however, grows curious and wants to explore the area. Beyond the valley, she encounters Vathek, who is mourning for her supposed death. Both realise the sham. Vathek then orders Nouronihar to marry him, she abandons Gulchenrouz, and the Emir abandons hope.

Meanwhile, in Samarah, Carathis can discover no news of her son from reading the stars. Vathek's favorite wife, the sultana Dilara, writes to Carathis, informing her that her son has broken the condition of the Giaour's contract, by accepting Fakreddin's hospitality on the way to Istakhar. She asks him to drown Nouronihar, but Vathek refuses, because he intends to make her his queen. Carathis then decides to sacrifice Gulchenrouz, but before she can catch him, Gulchenrouz jumps into the arms of a Genie who protects him. That night, Carathis hears that Motavakel, Vathek's brother, is planning to lead a revolt against Morakanabad. Carathis tells Vathek that he has distinguished himself by breaking the laws of hospitality by 'seducing' the emir's daughter after sharing his bread, and that if he can commit one more crime along the way he shall enter Soliman's gates triumphant.

Vathek continues on his journey, reaches Rocnabad, and degrades and humiliates its citizens for his own pleasure.

A Genie asks Mohammed for permission to try to save Vathek from his eternal damnation. He takes the form of a saintly shepherd who plays the flute to make men realise their sins. The shepherd asks Vathek if he is done sinning, warns Vathek about Eblis, ruler of Hell, and asks Vathek to return home, destroy his tower, disown Carathis, and preach Islam. He has until a set moment to decide yes or no. Vathek's pride wins out, and he tells the shepherd that he will continue on his quest for power, and values Nouronihar more than life itself or God's mercy. The moment is past, and the shepherd screams and vanishes. Vathek's servants desert him; Nouronihar becomes immensely prideful.

Finally, Vathek reaches Istakhar, where he finds more swords with writing on them, which says "Thou hast violated the conditions of my parchment, and deserve to be sent back, but in favour to thy companion, and as the meed for what thou hast done to obtain it, Eblis permitted that the portal of this place will receive thee" (108). The Giaour opens the gates with a golden key, and Vathek and Nouronihar step through into a place of gold where Genies of both sexes dance lasciviously. The Giaour leads them to Eblis, who tells them that they may enjoy whatever his empire holds. Vathek asks to be taken to the talismans that govern the world. There, Soliman tells Vathek that he had once been a great king, but was seduced by a Jinn and received the power to make everyone in the world do his bidding. But because of this, Soliman is destined to suffer in hell for a finite but vast period—until the waterfall he is sitting beside, stops. This eventual end to his punishment is due to his piety in the earlier part of his reign. The other inmates must suffer the fire in their hearts for all eternity. Vathek asks the Giaour to release him, saying he will relinquish all he was offered, but the Giaour refuses. He tells Vathek to enjoy his omnipotence while it lasts, for in a few days he will be tormented.

Vathek and Nouronihar become increasingly discontented with the palace of flames. Vathek orders an ifrit to fetch Carathis from the castle. While the ifrit is bringing Carathis, Vathek meets some people who are, like him, awaiting the execution of their own sentences of eternal suffering. Three relate to Vathek how they got to Eblis' domain. When Carathis arrives, he warns her of what happens to those who enter Eblis' domain, but Carathis takes the talismans of earthly power from Soliman regardless. She gathers the Jinns and tries to overthrow one of the Solimans, but Eblis decrees "It is time." Carathis, Vathek, Nouronihar, and the other denizens of hell lose "the most precious gift granted by heaven – HOPE" (119). They begin to feel eternal remorse for their crimes, their hearts burning with literal eternal fire.

Characters 

Carathis Vathek's mother. She is a Greek woman who is well versed in science, astrology, and occult magic. She teaches all of her skills to Vathek, and convinces him to embark on his quest for power which eventually leads to his damnation. When arriving in hell, Carathis runs amok, exploring the palace, discovering its hidden secrets, and even tries to stage a rebellion. However, once her own punishment is enacted, she too loses all hope and is consumed by her guilt.

Vathek Ninth Caliph of the Abassides, who ascended to the throne at an early age. His figure was pleasing and majestic, but when angry, his eyes became so terrible that "the wretch on whom it was fixed instantly fell backwards and sometimes expired" (1). He was addicted to women and pleasures of the flesh, so he ordered five palaces to be built: the five palaces of the senses. Although he was an eccentric man, he was learned in the ways of science, physics, and astrology. His chief sin, gluttony, paved the path of his damnation.

Giaour His name means blasphemer and infidel. He claims to be an Indian merchant, but in actuality he is a Jinn who works for the arch-demon Eblis. He guides Vathek and gives him instructions on how to reach the palace of fire.

Emir Fakreddin Vathek's host during his travels. He offers Vathek a place to stay and rest. He is deeply religious. Vathek betrays his hospitality by seducing his daughter.

Nouronihar The Emir's daughter, a beautiful girl who is promised to Gulchenrouz, but is seduced by Vathek and joins him in his road to damnation.

Gulchenrouz A beautiful young man with feminine features. He is the Emir's nephew. Due to his innocence, he is rescued from Carathis's hands and is allowed to live in eternal youth in a palace above the clouds.

Bababalouk Head of Vathek's eunuchs. He is cunning and acts as a steward on Vathek's journey.

Morakanabad Vathek's loyal and unsuspecting vizier.

Sutlememe The Emir's head eunuch who serves as a caretaker for Nouronihar and Gulchenrouz.

Dilara Vathek's favourite wife.

Themes
Afrit – described as a creature comparable to the Lamia and Medusa, depicted as the cruelest type of demon (div) in Vathek.

Bilqis (Balkis in Vathek) (( );) – a woman who ruled the ancient kingdom of Sheba and is referred to in Habeshan history, the Hebrew Bible, the New Testament, and the Qur'an. She is mentioned (unnamed) in the Bible in the Books of Kings and Book of Chronicles as a great queen who seeks out Solomon to learn if the tales of his wisdom are true. She is also mentioned in Jewish legends as a queen with a great love for learning, in African tales as "the queen of Egypt and Ethiopia", and in Muslim tradition as Balkis, a great queen of a nation that worshiped the sun who later converted to Solomon's god. The Roman historian Josephus calls her Nicaule. She is thought to have been born on 5 January, sometime in the 10th century BC.

Dive – an evil creature, a demon.

Eunuch – a castrated man; the term usually refers to those castrated to perform a specific social function, as was common in many societies of the past.

Khalif (Caliph in Vathek) (from Arabic خلافة khilāfa) – the head of state in a caliphate, and the title for the leader of the Islamic Ummah, or global Islamic nation. It is a transliterated version of the Arabic word خليفة Khalīfah which means "successor" or "representative". The early leaders of the Muslim nation following Muhammad's (570–632) death were called "Khalifat ar-rasul Allah," meaning political successor.

Fortress of Aherman – a fortress in which demons would gather to receive the commands of their lord.

Jinn – according to Middle Eastern mythology, they governed the Earth before humans. They are formed of subtler matter than humans and likewise capable of salvation.

Layla and Majnun – famous lovers in Middle Eastern legends.

Eblis  (Arabic إبليس) – lord of the apostate angels, who were cast into the underworld after refusing to bow before Adam.

Mount Qaf – believed to be a mountain surrounding the Earth.

Simurgh – a wise and miraculous bird, friendly towards "the sons of Adam" and an enemy to the divs.

Setting
Architecture is used to illustrate certain elements of Vathek's character and to warn of the dangers of over-reaching. Vathek's hedonism and devotion to pleasure are reflected in the pleasure wings he adds on to his castle, each with the express purpose of satisfying a different sense. He builds a tall tower in order to further his quest for knowledge. This tower stands for Vathek's pride and desire for a power beyond the reach of humans. He is later warned that he must destroy the tower and return to Islam, or risk dire consequences. Vathek's pride wins out, and in the end his quest for power and knowledge ends with him confined to hell.

Literary significance and criticism
Lord Byron cited Vathek as a source for his poem The Giaour. In Childe Harold's Pilgrimage, Byron also calls Vathek "England's wealthiest son". Other Romantic poets wrote works with a Middle Eastern setting inspired by Vathek, including Robert Southey's Thalaba the Destroyer (1801) and Thomas Moore's Lalla-Rookh (1817). John Keats's vision of the Underworld in Endymion (1818) is indebted to the novel.

Edgar Allan Poe mentions the infernal terrace seen by Vathek in "Landor's Cottage". Stéphane Mallarmé, who translated Poe's poems into French, inspired by this reference in "Landor's Cottage," had Vathek reprinted in its original French, for which edition he also supplied a preface.  In his book English Prose Style, Herbert Read cited Vathek as "one of the best fantasies in the language".

H. P. Lovecraft also cited Vathek as the inspiration for his unfinished novel Azathoth. Vathek is also believed to have been a model for Lovecraft's completed novel The Dream-Quest of Unknown Kadath.

American fantasy author Clark Ashton Smith greatly admired Vathek. Smith later wrote "The Third Episode of Vathek", the completion of a fragment by Beckford that was entitled "The Story of the Princess Zulkaïs and the Prince Kalilah". "The Third Episode of Vathek" was published in R. H. Barlow's fanzine Leaves in 1937, and later in Smith's 1960 collection The Abominations of Yondo.

Vathek has been well received by historians of the fantasy genre; Les Daniels stated Vathek was "a unique and delightful book". Daniels argued Vathek had little in common with the other "Gothic" novels; "Beckford's luxuriant imagery and sly humour create a mood totally antithetical to that suggested by the grey castles and black deeds of medieval Europe". Franz Rottensteiner calls the novel "a marvellous story, the creation of an erratic but powerful imagination, which brilliantly evokes the mystery and wonder associated with the Orient" and Brian Stableford has praised the work as the "classic novel Vathek—a feverish and gleefully perverse decadent/Arabian fantasy".

Allusions/references in other works
 Eblis, the architect of Vathek's damnation, was modelled on Iblis or Azazil; Beckford's depiction of Eblis is derived from John Milton's Paradise Lost's Satan (1667 and 1674; see Fallen angel).
 Argentinian writer Eduardo Berti's short story "El traductor apresurado" ("The Hurried Translator", published in 2002 in La vida imposible) strongly alludes to Beckford's novel. 
 Chapter 7 of Roberto Bolaño's Distant Star (1996) mentions it.
 Vathek, a symphonic poem written in 1913, composed by Luís de Freitas Branco, was inspired by this novel.
 Another symphonic poem by the same title came from Horatio Parker in 1903.
 Vathek's insatiable thirst for knowledge also parallels the attitude seen in the character of Dr. Faustus, in Christopher Marlowe's Dr. Faustus (1604), a work based on the German legend of Faust.
 H. G. Wells alludes to it in Tono-Bungay (1909).
 The Spanish musician Luis Delgado has published an album called Vathek (1982), inspired by the literary work.
 An episode of Extreme Ghostbusters, "Deadliners", has malevolent spirits known as the Vathek.

References

Sources
 Beckford, William, Vathek: The English Translation by Samuel Henley (1786) and the French Editions of Lausanne and Paris (1787, postdated), 1972, Facsimile ed., 3 vols. in 1, Scholars' Facsimiles & Reprints, .
 Salah S. Ali: Vathek as a Translation of a Lost Tale from the Arabian Nights.
 Laurent Châtel, Utopies paysagères: vues et visions dans les écrits et dans les jardins de William Beckford (1760–1844), Université Paris III–Sorbonne Nouvelle (2000), 769 p. 2 vols.
 Laurent Châtel, "Les sources des contes orientaux de William Beckford" ("Vathek et la 'Suite des contes arabes' "), Epistémé (2005): article online: http://www.etudes-episteme.org/ee/articles.php?lng=fr&pg=81
 Laurent Châtel, William Beckford - The Elusive Orientalist (Oxford: The Oxford University Studies in the Enlightenment, 2016).  ISSN 0435-2866 : https://voltairefoundation.wordpress.com/tag/william-beckford/
 
 Beckford, William, Vathek et ses épisodes, Préface et édition critique – Didier Girard, Paris, J. Corti, 2003

Further reading
 "On William Beckford's Vathek", Jorge Luis Borges (in Selected Non-fictions)
 Didier Girard, William Beckford : Terroriste au Palais de la Raison, Paris, José Corti, 1993.
 D. Girard & S. Jung (eds.), Inscribing Dreams: William Beckford as a Writer  Gent – UG Press, 2012.

External links
 
 
 
 
 

1786 novels
French-language novels
English Gothic novels
English fantasy novels
1780s fantasy novels
Fictional emperors and empresses
British horror novels
Fictional characters who have made pacts with devils
Fictional caliphs